Alessia Tuttino (born 15 March 1983) is an Italian football midfielder who plays for UPC Tavagnacco of Serie A and the Italy women's national football team. At club level she previously represented TC Rivignano, Foroni Verona, ASD Bardolino and GS Roma. She was part of the Italian squad at the 2009 and 2013 editions of the UEFA Women's Championship.

A central midfielder with a high work rate, Tuttino's playing style has sometimes been compared to that of the contemporary male footballer Gennaro Gattuso.

International career

Tuttino made her senior debut for Italy on 13 February 2002, in a 2–0 friendly win over the Netherlands.

A cruciate ligament injury caused a disappointed Tuttino to miss UEFA Women's Euro 2005. She appeared in her first major championships at UEFA Women's Euro 2009, where she scored the winning goal in the first match of the tournament against England.

National coach Antonio Cabrini named Tuttino in his selection for UEFA Women's Euro 2013 in Sweden. Italy were eliminated in the quarter-finals by Germany, as they had been in 2009.

However, she finished her international career with 133 appearances and 10 goals.

References

External links

Alessia Tuttino at Football.it 

1983 births
Living people
Italian women's footballers
Italy women's international footballers
Serie A (women's football) players
A.S.D. AGSM Verona F.C. players
Sportspeople from Udine
FIFA Century Club
Women's association football midfielders
U.P.C. Tavagnacco players
A.S.D. Calcio Chiasiellis players
Roma Calcio Femminile players
Footballers from Friuli Venezia Giulia
Foroni Verona F.C. players